Francis Spring (circa 1660 – 1711) was an Anglo-Irish politician.

Spring was the great-grandson of Thomas Spring of Castlemaine. In 1699 he was a Commissioner for the collection of taxation in County Kildare. He represented Naas as a Member of Parliament in the Irish House of Commons between 1703 and his death in 1711.  He served as High Sheriff of Kildare in 1709.

On 18 November 1703 he presented a petition to the Commons alongside other Kildare MPs to complain about the practices of John and Francis Annesley, Justices of the Peace in the county.

References

Year of birth unknown
1711 deaths
17th-century Anglo-Irish people
18th-century Anglo-Irish people
High Sheriffs of Kildare
Irish MPs 1703–1713
Spring family
Members of the Parliament of Ireland (pre-1801) for County Kildare constituencies
Year of birth uncertain